Bat-and-ball may refer to:
Bat-and-ball games
Bat & Ball Inn, Hambledon in Hampshire, England
Bat & Ball railway station in Kent, England